Sun Valley may refer to:

Places

Australia
 Sun Valley, New South Wales
 Sun Valley, Queensland, a suburb of Gladstone

United States
Valley of the Sun, a region that covers the Phoenix metropolitan area
Sun Valley, Arizona
Sun Valley, Los Angeles, California
Sun Valley, Denver, Colorado
Sun Valley, Idaho
Sun Valley, Nevada
Sun Valley, Pennsylvania
Sun Valley, Texas
Sun Valley, West Virginia

Elsewhere
Sun Valley, Saskatchewan, Canada
Sun Valley, Parañaque, Metro Manila, Philippines
Sun Valley, Honiara, Solomon Islands
Sun Valley (Taiwan), a tourist attraction in Yanchao District, Kaohsiung

Other uses
The Sun Valley, a version of the Mercury Montclair automobile made in 1954 and 1955
"Sun Valley", a United States Air Force codename for C-130A-II Sigint missions to monitor Soviet transmissions in the late 1950s
Sun Valley (film), a Chinese film
Sun Valley Serenade, a 1941 musical film
Sun Valley Magazine, an American magazine published in Idaho
Sunvalley Shopping Center, a mall in Concord, California
SunValley Speedway (renamed Motoplex Speedway), an auto racing facility in British Columbia
 "Sun Valley", a codename for the Windows 11 operating system
Allen & Company Sun Valley Conference in Idaho

See also
Sunny Valley, Oregon
Valley of the Sun, Phoenix, Arizona
Valley of the Sun (film), a 1942 Western film
Sun Valley Airport (disambiguation)
Sun Valley High School (disambiguation)